Cédric Bockhorni (born 5 September 1983) is a French former professional footballer who played as a defender. He played for Clermont Foot, R.E. Virton, and AS Nancy.

Career
Bockhorni left Clermont at the end of the 2015–16 season with his contract running out, putting an end to a ten-year spell at the club.

References

External links
 
 
 
 

1983 births
Living people
French footballers
Association football defenders
Ligue 2 players
Championnat National 3 players
AS Nancy Lorraine players
Clermont Foot players
R.E. Virton players
French Romani people
France youth international footballers